Ralph Foster Smart  (27 August 1908 – 12 February 2001) was a film and television producer, director, and writer, born in England to Australian parents.

Biography
Smart found work in Britain with Anthony Asquith and later alongside the film director Michael Powell, whom he assisted with 'quota quickies': low-budget B-pictures to meet a legal commitment to the British film industry under the Cinematograph Films Act 1927.

During the Second World War, Smart joined the Royal Australian Air Force in 1942 and served until 1945. Afterward he worked for the Rank Organisation and Ealing Studios, returning to Australia to direct several films beginning with The Overlanders and including Bitter Springs (1950), addressing the mistreatment of young Aborigines.

Back again in Britain, he became an influential figure in ITC television, producing, directing or writing a number of television series and films, including the 1950s series The Adventures of Robin Hood and The Invisible Man. Later he created and produced the highly successful spy series Danger Man (also known as Secret Agent in the United States).

In 2000 he was awarded the Order of Australia Medal for "services to the development of the Australian film industry".

He retired to Australia, and died on 12 February 2001, in Bowen, Queensland.

Selected filmography
 A Cottage on Dartmoor (1929) – uncredited writer
 The Woodpigeon Patrol (short; 1930) – writer, director
 The Star Reporter (1932) – writer
 Hotel Splendide (1932) – writer
 C.O.D. (1932) – writer
 His Lordship (1932) – writer
 Born Lucky (1933) – writer
 The Murder Party (1935) – writer
 The Phantom Light (1935) – writer
 Crime Unlimited (1935) – writer
 Sweet Success (short; 1936) – director
 Convict 99 (1938) – writer
 Alf's Button Afloat (1938) – writer
 The Good Old Days (1940) – story
 Charley's (Big-Hearted) Aunt (1940) – writer
 South West Pacific (1943) – actor
 Island Target (documentary; 1945) – director
 The Overlanders (1946) – writer, associate producer
 Bush Christmas (1947) – writer, director, producer
 Eureka Stockade (1948) – writer (additional scenes)
 Quartet (1948; anthology film, segment The Facts of Life) – director
 A Boy, a Girl and a Bike (1949) – director
 Bitter Springs (1950) – story, director
 Where No Vultures Fly (1951) – writer
 Never Take No For an Answer (1951) – writer, director
 Curtain Up (1952) – director
 Always a Bride (1953) – writer, director
 The Adventures of Robin Hood (TV series; 1955–57) – writer, director
 The Adventures of Sir Lancelot (TV series; 1956) – director
 The Buccaneers (TV series; 1956) – director, producer
 The Flying Scot (1957) – co-writer
 The Adventures of Mr. Pastry (TV short; 1958) – director
 William Tell (TV series; 1958–59) – writer, director, producer
 The Invisible Man (TV series; 1958–59) – writer, director, producer
 Danger Man (TV series; 1960–61) – co-creator, writer, director, producer
 Danger Man (TV series; 1964–66, US title: Secret Agent) – co-creator, writer, script editor, executive producer
 Riptide (TV series; 1969) – writer, producer
 My Partner the Ghost (TV series; 1969) – writer
 The Protectors (TV series; 1972) – writer
 Elephant Boy (TV series; 1972) – writer

Writing credits

References

External links
 
 Ralph Smart at AustLit: The Australian Literature Resource
 Article linking three seminal TV shows
 Ralph Smart & Hannah Weinstein & British TV

1908 births
2001 deaths
British emigrants to Australia
English television producers 
English people of Australian descent
English film directors
Recipients of the Medal of the Order of Australia
Writers from London
Royal Australian Air Force personnel of World War II